Polylopha oachranta is a species of moth of the family Tortricidae. It is found on the Mariana Islands in the western North Pacific Ocean.

References

Moths described in 1974
Polyorthini